Laura Allende Gossens (3 September 1911 – 23 May 1981) was a Chilean politician, a member of the lower chamber of parliament and sister of former president of Chile Salvador Allende.

Early life
A member of the Allende family, Laura was of Basque and Belgian (Walloons) descent. She was born in Tacna, then under Chilean rule, the youngest child of Salvador Allende Castro and Laura Uribe.  Laura Allende completed her studies at the Colegio de los Sagrados Corazones de Valparaíso and the Liceo of Viña del Mar. She later studied law at the Universidad de Chile in Valparaíso for four years, but never completed her degree. While at the university, she joined the  Chilean Socialist Party (PS), of which in time she would become a member of its central committee.

She married Gastón Pascal Lyon, with whom she had four children, among them Andrés Pascal Allende, the future revolutionary. She also worked at the Copper Office (Departamento del Cobre) from 1955 to 1965, before launching her political career.

Political career
In 1965, she was elected deputy for Santiago and Talagante. In 1969 she was reelected, and again in 1973. During this time she was part of two international delegations: first to Havana in 1971, and then to China, in May 1973. At that time, she already was showing the first symptoms of the lymphatic cancer that was to haunt her till the end of her life.

On November 2, 1974 she was arrested together with her daughter Marianne. The two were taken to the prison camp of Cuatro Alamos. Later exiled from the country, she relocated to Mexico. In 1976 she moved to Cuba, where she lived until her death.

After being diagnosed with terminal cancer she committed suicide in Havana, Cuba, on May 23, 1981. After Chile's return to democracy in 1990, her body was returned and on August 28, 1998, she was reinterred at the Allende family mausoleum in Santiago.

See also
Andrés Pascal Allende
History of Chile

References

External links
Chilean Library of Congress biography 
Family information from official site 
Memories of her arrest at Cuatro Alamos 

1911 births
1981 suicides
People from Valparaíso
Laura
Chilean people of Basque descent
Socialist Party of Chile politicians
Deputies of the XLV Legislative Period of the National Congress of Chile
Deputies of the XLVI Legislative Period of the National Congress of Chile
Deputies of the XLVII Legislative Period of the National Congress of Chile
20th-century Chilean women politicians
Women members of the Chamber of Deputies of Chile
Salvador Allende
Chilean prisoners and detainees
Prisoners and detainees of Chile
Chilean exiles
Chilean emigrants to Cuba